The Zone of Peace, Freedom and Neutrality (ZOPFAN) is a declaration signed by the Foreign Ministers of the ASEAN member states (Indonesia, Malaysia, the Philippines, Singapore and Thailand) in 1971 in Kuala Lumpur, Malaysia.

In the declaration, the parties publicly stated their intent to keep South East Asia "free from any form or manner of interference by outside Powers" and "broaden the areas of cooperation."

External links
Text of the declaration

ASEAN laws